The Territory of Arizona (also known as Arizona Territory) was a territory of the United States that existed from February 24, 1863, until February 14, 1912, when the remaining extent of the territory was admitted to the Union as the state of Arizona. It was created from the western half of the New Mexico Territory during the American Civil War.

History

Following the expansion of the New Mexico Territory in 1853, as a result of the Gadsden Purchase, several proposals for a division of the territory and the organization of a separate Territory of Arizona in the southern half of the territory were advanced as early as 1856. These proposals arose from concerns about the ability of the territorial government in Santa Fe to effectively administer the newly acquired southern portions of the territory.

The first proposal dates from a conference held in Tucson that convened on August 29, 1856. The conference issued a petition to the U.S. Congress, signed by 256 people, requesting organization of the territory and elected Nathan P. Cook as the territorial delegate to Congress. In January 1857, the bill for the organization of the territory was introduced into the House of Representatives, but the proposal was defeated on the grounds that the population of the proposed territory was yet too small.  Later, a similar proposal was defeated in the Senate. The proposal for creation of the territory was controversial in part because of the perception that the New Mexico Territory was under the influence of southern sympathizers who were highly desirous of expanding slavery into the southwest.

In February 1858, the New Mexico territorial legislature adopted a resolution in favor of the creation of the Arizona territory, but with a north–south border along the 109th meridian, with the additional stipulation that all the Indians of New Mexico would be removed to northern Arizona.

In April 1860, impatient for Congress to act, a convention of 31 delegates met in Tucson and adopted a constitution for a provisional territorial government of the area south of 34°N. The delegates elected Dr. Lewis S. Owings as provisional governor.

American Civil War

At the outbreak of the Civil War, sentiment in the territory was in favor of the Confederacy. Territorial secession conventions called at Mesilla and Tucson in March 1861 adopted an ordinance of secession, established a provisional Arizona Territory with Owings as its governor, and petitioned the Confederate Congress for admission.

The Confederacy regarded the territory as a valuable route for possible access to the Pacific Ocean, with the specific intention of capturing California. In July 1861, a small Confederate force of Texans under the command of Lieutenant Colonel John R. Baylor assaulted Fort Fillmore at Mesilla in the eastern part of the territory. After the fort was abandoned by the Union garrison, Baylor's force cut off the fleeing Union troops and forced them to surrender. On August 1, 1861, Baylor issued a "Proclamation to the People of the Territory of Arizona", taking possession of the territory for the Confederacy, with Mesilla as the capital and himself as the governor, establishing Confederate Arizona. Baylor's subsequent dismantling of the existing Union forts in the territory left the white settlers at the mercy of the Apache, who quickly gained control of the area and forced many of the white settlers to seek refuge in Tucson.

On August 28, a convention met again in Tucson and declared that the territory formed the previous year was part of the Confederacy. Granville H. Oury was elected as delegate to the Confederate Congress. Oury drafted legislation authorizing the organization of the Confederate Territory of Arizona. The legislation passed on January 13, 1862, and the territory was officially created by proclamation of President Jefferson Davis on February 14.

The following month, in March 1862, the U.S. House of Representatives, now devoid of the southern delegates and controlled by Republicans, passed a bill to create the United States Arizona Territory using the north–south border of the 109th meridian. The use of a north–south border rather than an east–west one had the effect of denying a de facto ratification of the Confederate Arizona Territory. The house bill stipulated that Tucson was to be the capital. The final bill passed the Senate in February 1863 without the Tucson-as-capital stipulation, and was signed into law by President Abraham Lincoln on February 24, the date of the official organization of the U.S. Arizona Territory.

Capital

The first capital was established in 1864 at Prescott, in the northern Union-controlled area. The capital was moved to Tucson in 1868, and back to Prescott in 1877. The capital was finally moved to Phoenix on February 4, 1889.

Boundary

The boundaries for the original territory, if they had kept their same size, would have made present-day Las Vegas part of Arizona. In 1867, though, Congress transferred the Arizona Territory's northwestern corner, specifically most of its land west of the Colorado River, to the state of Nevada.  This reduced the territory to its current area.

Statehood
The territory was admitted to the Union as the 48th state on February 14, 1912.

Territorial proclamation
Proclamation to the People of Arizona.

See also

 American Civil War, 1861–1865
 Territory of Arizona (Confederate States), 1861–1862
 Apache Wars, 1851–1886
 Pah-Ute County, "Arizona's Lost County" 1865–1871
 Camp Grant Massacre, 1871
 Gadsden Purchase, 1853
 Governors of the Territory of Arizona
 History of Arizona
 James Reavis, The "Baron of Arizona"
 Mexican–American War, 1846–1848
 Treaty of Guadalupe Hidalgo, 1848
 Navajo Wars, 1846–1865
 Territorial evolution of the United States

References
Notes

Further reading
 Cheek, Lawrence W. (1995). Arizona. Oakland, CA: Compass American Guides. .

External links

 Compiled Laws And Revised Statutes Of Arizona Territory

 

Former organized territories of the United States
History of Arizona
History of the American West
New Mexico Territory
Utah Territory

1863 establishments in New Mexico Territory

States and territories established in 1863
States and territories disestablished in 1912
Cochise County conflict